Rochette may refer to:

Surname 
Desiré-Raoul Rochette (1790-1854), a French archaeologist.
Edward C. Rochette (1927–2018), American numismatist
Jean-Marc Rochette (b. 1956), a French painter, illustrator and comics creator.
Joannie Rochette (b. 1986), a Canadian figure skater.
Nicolas Gargot de la Rochette, Governor of Plaisance (Placentia)

Other uses 
La Rochette (disambiguation), the name of several communes in France
Prix La Rochette, a Group 3 flat horse race in France
Rochette bridge, a type of dental prosthesis popular in the 1970s invented by Alain Rochette of France.

French-language surnames

ceb:Rochette